Institut Latihan Perindustrian Kuala Lumpur or its English name Industrial Training Institute of Kuala Lumpur, also known as ILPKL is a public vocational college situated in a 13.7 acre land in Kuchai Lama, suburb of Kuala Lumpur, Malaysia. Founded in 1964 under Jabatan Tenaga Manusia, JTM (Manpower Department), ILPKL is one of the oldest institute of technology in Malaysia. It is one of 32 Institut Latihan Jabatan Tenaga Manusia, ILJTM (Manpower Department Training Institutes). Today, ILPKL offers 12 courses. Currently under the direction of the 13th director, Abd Halim bin Ali Mohammed, ILPKL is able to accommodate 1100 students at one time.

History

In 1957, Central Apprenticeship Board was formed by Kementerian Buroh (Ministry of Labour), currently known as Kementerian Sumber Manusia (Ministry of Human Resources) which mark the commencement of Malaysian vocational education standard. ILPKL was originally established to help high school graduates who failed to do well in academics to hone their skills in vocational trades. Six years later, in January 1963 construction process of ILPKL begins with a budget of RM 1.5 million and finish in May 1964. ILPKL, originally named Pusat Latehan Keusahawanan (Entrepreneurial Training Centre) was inaugurated on 9 March 1965 by Yang di-Pertuan Agong of that time, Raja Syed Harrun Putra ibni Syed Hassan Jamalullail. Ford Foundation as well as Asia Foundation contributed the books for the institute.

On 1 July 1965, ILPKL opened technic course for contractors. On 13–22 September 1976, ILPKL lecturers were trained in In Plant Training (Fluid Power) in Dikin Kogyo Co. Ltd, Osaka, Japan. ILPKL officers once again underwent training in Osaka, this time is High Skilled Machinist Course at Higashiyodagawa Advanced Vocational Training Centre.

There were Japanese lecturers from ILO and American lecturers from BISCO. The three first programmes taught at ILPKL are electrical, building construction and printing with infrastructures from Japan and Australia. ILPKL also have been visited by numerous VIPs and organizations in its history including Malaysia's first Prime Minister Tunku Abdul Rahman Putra Al-Haj, second Prime Minister Tun Abdul Razak, fourth Prime Minister Tun Mahathir, V. Manickavasagam and Datuk Richard Ho.

The government later realized that the country is lacked of skilled workers, and as a developing country, the need for more proficient tradesmen is crucial for country's growth and to eliminate the dependability on foreign workforces. The government is also trying to reflect advanced countries such as Germany and Japan where students who are good in academic pick vocational field as their career. This leads to renovation, upgrade and expansion of ILPKL.

List of directors
Here is a list of all ILPKL directors from 1965 to 2014:

Peru Mohamed bin Asan Mydin
Ibrahim Mohamad
Wan Seman bin Wan Ahmad
Rosti Saruwono
Amir bin Abdullah
How Chin Chong
Abdullah bin Ali
Syed Mohamad Noor bin Syed Ali
Nik Othman bin Daud
Mohd Hashimi bin Abd Hadi
Mohamad Manoj bin Jumidali
Eng. Kamaruzaman bin Hj Md. Ali BK, MMSET
Abd Halim bin Ali Mohammed

Campus and facilities

ILPKL has over 30 blocks of buildings. Blocks of workshops and classrooms are separated. This is done to allow the students to concentrate without noises generated by power tools etc. in the workshops. The main academic building is next to the Bahagian Pengurusan Pelajar dan Latihan (Students and Training Management Department) block. It consists of three levels. Level 1 is where the computer laboratories for ICT and computer aided design subjects are situated. Level 2 is dedicated for common subjects faculty (physics, mathematics, English, Islamic studies) while level 3 is for the core subjects.

The institute is well equipped with modern and sophisticated training facilities worth millions of Ringgits including a dynamometer machine, autotronic laboratory and imported vehicles for automotive department. A diesel calibration laboratory is also provided and rented by certain private college with an absence of such equipments. There is a main hall, computer laboratories, mosque which is opened to public, cafeteria, two-level dining hall, an auditorium with a capacity of 400, kiosk and library. Certain classrooms are also provided with air-conditioners.

They also have well sports facilities such as soccer and netball fields, and courts for volleyball, futsal, tennis, takraw and badminton. ILPKL has more than 10 buildings for accommodation including for students, lecturers, staff, guests and director. Male students live in a room for two, except for freshmen who are required to live in the dormitory system, similar to MIT. Three blocks are dedicated for male students while two for females. The student hostels are provided with televisions, satellite channel service, washing machines, water coolers and heaters and study rooms. Wi-Fi is also available. Transportation of ILPKL including buses, lorry, van and car.

Training

Classes
There are several main faculties in ILPKL, including mechanical and servicing, electrical and electronics and machining. ILPKL curriculum bias is about 30 - 40% of theory and 60 - 70% of practical. Today, ILPKL includes general subjects: engineering mathematics and science, English, ICT, CAD and Islamic/moral studies, along with core subjects to provide the students with more career potential. Numerous courses are offered at ILPKL, and all of them emphasize technical fields.

Automotive Technology - DKM available
Electrical Technology - DKM available
Computer Technology (System) - DKM available
Industrial Electronics - DVM available
Arc and Gas Welding Technology
Graphic Technology
Prepress Technology
Printing Technology
Computer Numerical Control (CNC) Machining - DVM available
Quality Assurance Engineering - DVM available
Refrigeration and Air Conditioning
Industrial Mechanic

DKM denotes courses with JPK's diploma level offered as optional.
DVM denotes courses with diploma offered for four-year KV programmes.

At the end of each semester, ILPKL will run an evaluation by taking feedbacks from students regarding their lecturers, training equipments, accommodation facilities, reference material, syllabus etc.

ILPKL is providing short term classes too. They are for non-students such as professional workers in the industry and university lecturers who are looking for extra training. In 1999, ILPKL reach 369 participants of short term classes from 26 courses. They also frequently organizing educational events such as seminars on solar, network security and hybrid.

Training and other expenses including meals and accommodation worth of RM6,000 for each student every semester is fully borne by the government provision. Monthly allowance is also paid to students.

Certifications
Technicians with certifications from ILPKL are the most pursued labors by companies in Malaysia. Certificates for ILPKL graduates including Sijil Kemahiran Malaysia, SKM (Malaysia Skills Certificate) level 2 or 3 depending on courses, but mostly level 3 and Diploma Kemahiran Malaysia, DKM (Malaysia Skills Diploma) which is optional and currently only available for three courses, both of which are issued by Jabatan Pembangunan Kemahiran, JPK (Skills Development Department) which is under the same ministry as JTM. They are the top certifications in Malaysian vocational education standard. The graduates will also be provided with Sijil Teknologi, ST (Technology Certificate) issued by Manpower Department which indicates that the person is a graduate of an ILJTM, which means he was trained by the best lecturers, infrastructures, and discipline. The ST is also a prove that engineering subjects such as mathematics, science, ICT and CAD were included in his syllabus.

ILPKL also offering courses of Diploma Vokasional Malaysia, DVM (Malaysia Vocational Diploma) issued by Kementerian Pelajaran (Ministry of Education) for kolej vokasional, KV (vocational college) students. ILPKL is the only institute in Malaysia which is issuing the full three-phase electrical wiring (PW4) certificate for level 3. For non-ILPKL graduates, they have to take the DKM (level 4) for another year, have a minimum working experience of two years, learn the same subjects again for six months, pay a fee to sit for the exam and have their certificate issued by Suruhanjaya Tenaga (Energy Commission). ILPKL also issuing Welder Qualification Test (WQT) license which approve a welder to weld in an oil rig. Since 2012, ILPKL obtain the 5S certification, a certification awarded to organizations conducting work in a clean, tidy and safe manner. 5S is a Japanese work ethic known as kaizen. ILPKL also received acknowledgement of MS ISO:9001.

ILPKL is frequently considered as a university for skill training when compared to other institutes such as vocational schools, Community Colleges and GIATMARAs. As of 2014, ILPKL introduce four-year kolej vokasional, KV (vocational college) programmes. The KV programme students will receive a DVM which is equivalent to a diploma from polytechnics upon their graduation. A collaboration with Samsung lead to the establishment of JTM-Samsung, with ILPKL being the first and currently the only institute under JTM with official facilities from Samsung. Industrial electronics students will receive a certificate from Samsung upon graduation as well as SKM. Future plans of ILPKL including to introduce international programme, E-Learning, executive diploma etc. in 2015–2016.

Automotive faculty

The first diploma level introduced in ILPKL is automotive. ILPKL is always giving prestige to automotive department by giving foremost attention to them and entering all automotive competition such as Pertandingan Kemahiran Malaysia, PKM (Malaysia Skills Competition), innovation competition and motor sports including drag racing and go-kart. The automotive department of ILPKL is also a three years consecutive gold winner in automotive category. They are looking forward to represent Malaysia in the 2015 World Skills Competition in Brazil. Their invention of anti-theft system also gained a gold at Polytechnic. Hence ILPKL is well known as the Centre of Excellence in Automotive, which is perpetuated at the main gate and their administration building, under the inauguration commemorative plaque.

Activities and students
The institute is actively participating in skills and innovation competition including PKM, CITEC etc. Their industrial electronics department formed a robotic club and compete in Robot Challenge.

Students activities other than technical related are broad. ILPKL students can enjoy playing many kind of sports, such as soccer, tennis, volleyball, badminton, netball, takraw, futsal, bar gymnastics etc. The institute is regularly conducting sporting events, for instance the tournament between courses and player selection to represent institute. Other activities including charity run, marching, dance, choir, martial art and dikir barat. Their choir squad has reach the national level, performing in prestigious events attended by ministers of Malaysia.

The MSK
The infamous Minggu Suai Kenal (Orientation Week) of ILPKL is done twice a year. It is a tradition where the freshmen will be ragged with military style physical training for a week to see which students are really determined to study and to develop discipline and cooperation. They will be forced to strive in the forest, endure physical exercises without getting enough sleeps and abused with unkind words by the facilitators. The results are the disciplined and hardworking students.

Students Representative Council
Majlis Perwakilan Pelajar (Students Representative Council) of ILPKL strive for students rights and acting as a middle person between students and administration. They are voted by other students each semester, but the new rule require the council to last for a year. The council, led by a diploma student suggested some changes to the rules of institute in favor of the students, and some are granted by the director. They are also suggesting for some new facilities such as a gymnasium for students use.

Rivalry with ADTEC of Shah Alam
A college rivalry between ILPKL and Advanced Technology Training Centre (ADTEC) of Shah Alam is well known among students, given the location proximity between the two institutes. They compete in marching competitions and many athletic events as well as in training and innovation capabilities.

Graduates
ILPKL alumni are the first choice of 80% of the employers, therefore their graduates are seldom to be jobless. However, a division called Career Employment Support Service is established to assist graduates of finding the suitable employer after finishing their training. There are ILPKL alumni who become a successful entrepreneur, owning several car showrooms throughout the country, and there are also graduates hired by companies like Lamborghini and Mercedes-Benz and some are working in the motor sports industries. Graduates who wish to further their study will usually head to ADTECs to obtain a diploma or degree there.

References

ILJTR: Overview

Vocational colleges in Malaysia
Engineering universities and colleges in Malaysia
Technical universities and colleges in Malaysia
Colleges in Malaysia
Educational institutions established in 1964
1964 establishments in Malaysia
Universities and colleges in Kuala Lumpur